When Angels & Serpents Dance is the seventh studio album by Christian metal band P.O.D., released in 2008. It is the first album to include Marcos Curiel since Satellite and the first and only album to be produced for P.O.D. by INO/Columbia. It also includes Mike Muir from Suicidal Tendencies, Helmet guitarist/vocalist Page Hamilton, guest Gospel Choir, and the Marley Sisters. The album debuted at number 9 on the Billboard 200, selling over 34,000 copies in its first week. It has sold over 200,000 copies worldwide so far. A remixed and remastered version of the album, relabeled under Mascot Records, was released on October 14th, 2022.

Pre-release

Performances
On June 1, 2007, at the ROCKBOX in San Diego, the band performed and revealed a new song entitled "Condescending", along with another new song performed on June 16, 2007, at the Journeys Backyard BBQ tour entitled "Addicted". They also revealed the title of their new album to be "When Angels & Serpents Dance".

On August 4, 2007 the band played at Angel Stadium of Anaheim's annual Harvest Crusade where they revealed a new song entitled "I'll Be Ready" for a crowd of 42,000, the largest number in attendance for the three-day event.

Cover artwork
On December 1, P.O.D. posted a blog on their MySpace that they had set up a "secret" website to reveal pieces of the cover to the public from December 3 – 10. P.O.D. also posted the lyrics to one of their songs on the "secret" website. They are as follows: "One must lead in the dance. Who's leading you? Life is real when angels and serpents dance."

In the early morning of December 10, 2007, in addition to the unveiling of the final pieces of the album cover, it was officially announced on P.O.D.'s "secret website" that When Angels & Serpents Dance would be released on April 8, 2008.

Website
For the better part of 2007, payableondeath.com, the main website for P.O.D., featured only a picture of the band with Marcos from the 2002 Still Payin' Dues DVD photoshoot, and a 30-second advertisement for Greatest Hits: The Atlantic Years. In a mass e-mail sent out in mid-December, the band announced that in conjunction with the 2008 New Year, a new website would be launched with an exclusive track from When Angels & Serpents Dance. On January 1, 2008, the website was updated and shows a video with a 30-second preview of the song "When Angels & Serpents Dance".

On January 25, 2008, a free download of the band's title song "When Angels & Serpents Dance" became available to the public.

Track listing

In other media
There are two songs featured in two different games:

 "Addicted" is used in the video game, WWE SmackDown vs. Raw 2009.
 "Condescending" is used in the video game, NASCAR 09.

Personnel
P.O.D.
 Sonny Sandoval – lead vocals
 Wuv Bernardo – drums, rhythm guitar, backing vocals
 Traa Daniels – bass, backing vocals
 Marcos Curiel – lead guitar, glockenspiel, programming, backing vocals

Additional musicians
 Vocals (God Forbid): Page Hamilton (appears courtesy of Helmet)
 Vocals (Kaliforn-Eye-A): Mike Muir (appears courtesy of Suicidal Tendencies / Infectious Grooves)
 Background vocals (I’ll Be Ready): The Marley Girls
 Background vocals: Crystal Taliefero, Mark Renk
 Keyboards (Rise Against): Jason Freese
 Additional vocal production: Mark Renk
 Strings: Suzie Katayama

References

P.O.D. albums
Columbia Records albums
2008 albums